Huntington Gap Wildlife Management Area is a wildlife management area in the U.S. state of Vermont. The area is owned by the State of Vermont and administered by the Vermont Fish & Wildlife Department.

The area is wholly contained within Camel's Hump Forest Reserve. It is bordered by Camel's Hump State Park on the north, south, and west. Its far western boundary extends to Lewis Creek Wildlife Management Area.

Description

The most prominent feature in the Huntington Gap Wildlife Management Area (WMA) is Huntington Gap, a low saddle on the eastern edge of the WMA. The Long Trail, the Catamount Trail, and a VAST snowmobile trail pass through Huntington Gap.

The spine of the Green Mountains runs along the eastern edge of the WMA. The summit of Beane Mountain is just outside the southern edge of the WMA.

The Huntington Gap Wildlife Management Area is completely covered by forest, a mix of northern hardwoods (sugar maple, yellow birch, American beech, eastern hemlock), red spruce, balsam fir, and mountain paper birch. Baker's Brook flows through the southern portion of the WMA; the source of Jones Brook is located in the northern portion of the WMA.

Bibliography

References

Protected areas of Chittenden County, Vermont
Protected areas of Washington County, Vermont
Huntington, Vermont
Buels Gore, Vermont
Fayston, Vermont